"Agosto" (from Spanish: August) is a song by Spanish-German singer-songwriter Álvaro Soler. It was written by Soler along with Ali Zuchowski and Simon Triebel for his 2015 debut studio album Eterno Agosto, while production was helmed by Zuchowski and Triebel. Released as the album's second single in November 2015 following the Europe-wide success of "El mismo sol", the mid-tempo song became his second consecutive song to top the Polish Airplay Top 100 chart. Elsewhere, "Agosto" failed to chart, though it reached number 54 on the Ultratip Bubbling Under in the Flemish Region of Belgium. Its release was accompanied by a lyric video which was released through Soler's YouTube channel.

Track listing
Digital download
"Agosto" – 2:59

Charts

Certifications

References

2015 singles
Spanish-language songs
2015 songs
Álvaro Soler songs
Songs written by Simon Triebel
Number-one singles in Poland
Songs written by Álvaro Soler